The Conventual Church of St. Mary and St. John is a historic Episcopal church in Cambridge, Massachusetts.  The Romanesque Revival church was built in 1936 to a design by architect Ralph Adams Cram.  Cram sought to  reproduce 12th century ecclesiastical forms found in the Burgundy region of France.  The building was featured in a 1941 architectural magazine.  It is home to monks of the Society of Saint John the Evangelist of the Episcopal Church.

The church was listed on the National Register of Historic Places in 1982.

See also
National Register of Historic Places listings in Cambridge, Massachusetts

References

External links
Official website of Cambridge's Society of Saint John the Evangelist

Churches completed in 1936
Churches on the National Register of Historic Places in Massachusetts
Churches in Cambridge, Massachusetts
Ralph Adams Cram church buildings
Episcopal church buildings in Massachusetts
National Register of Historic Places in Cambridge, Massachusetts